The Haavara Agreement was an agreement between Nazi Germany and Zionist German Jews signed on 25 August 1933. The agreement was finalized after three months of talks by the Zionist Federation of Germany, the Anglo-Palestine Bank (under the directive of the Jewish Agency) and the economic authorities of Nazi Germany. It was a major factor in making possible the migration of approximately 60,000 German Jews to Palestine in 1933–1939.

The agreement enabled Jews fleeing persecution under the new Nazi regime to transfer some portion of their assets to British Mandatory Palestine. Emigrants sold their assets in Germany to pay for essential goods (manufactured in Germany) to be shipped to Mandatory Palestine. The agreement was controversial and was criticised by many Jewish leaders both within the Zionist movement (such as the Revisionist Zionist leader Ze'ev Jabotinsky) and outside it, as well as by members of both the Nazi Party and the German public. For German Jews, the agreement offered a way to leave an increasingly hostile environment in Germany; for the Yishuv, the Jewish community in Palestine, it offered access to both immigrant labour and economic support; for the Germans it facilitated the emigration of German Jews while breaking the anti-Nazi boycott of 1933, which had mass support among European and American Jews and was thought by the German state to be a potential threat to the German economy.

Background
Although the Nazi Party won the greatest share of the popular vote in the two Reichstag general elections of 1932, they did not have a majority, so Hitler led a short-lived coalition government formed by the Nazis and the German National People's Party. Under pressure from politicians, industrialists and others, President Paul von Hindenburg appointed Hitler as Chancellor of Germany on 30 January 1933. This event is known as the Machtergreifung (seizure of power). In the following months, the Nazis used a process termed Gleichschaltung (co-ordination) to consolidate power. By June 1933, virtually the only organisations not under the control of the Nazi party were the army and the churches.

Within the Nazi movement, a variety of (increasingly radical) "solutions" to the "Jewish Question" were proposed both before and after the Nazi party was in government, including expulsion and the encouragement of voluntary emigration. Widespread civil persecution of German Jews began as soon as the Nazis were in power. For example, on 1 April, the Nazis organized a nationwide boycott of Jewish-owned businesses in Germany; under the Law for the Restoration of the Professional Civil Service which was implemented on 7 April, Jews were excluded from the civil service; on 25 April, quotas were imposed on the number of Jews in schools and universities. Jews outside Germany responded to these persecutions with a boycott of German goods.

Meanwhile, in Mandatory Palestine, a growing Jewish population (174,610 in 1931, rising to 384,078 in 1936) was acquiring land and developing the structures of a future Jewish state despite opposition from the Arab population.

Hanotea company

Hanotea ("the Planter") was a citrus planting company based in Netanya and established in 1929 by long-established Jewish settlers in Palestine involved in the Benei Binyamin movement. In a deal worked out with the Reich Economics Ministry, the blocked German bank accounts of prospective immigrants would be unblocked and funds from them used by Hanotea to buy agricultural German goods; these goods, along with the immigrants, would then be shipped to Palestine, and the immigrants would be granted a house or citrus plantation by the company to the same value. Hanotea's director, Sam Cohen, represented the company in direct negotiation with the Reich Economics Ministry beginning in March 1933. In May 1933 Hanotea applied for permission to transfer capital from Germany to Palestine. This pilot arrangement appeared to be operating successfully, and so paved the way for the later Haavara Agreement.

The transfer agreement

The Haavara (Transfer) Agreement, negotiated by Eliezer Hoofein, director of the Anglo-Palestine Bank, was agreed to by the Reich Economics Ministry in 1933, and continued, with declining German government support, until it was wound up in 1939.  Under the agreement, Jews emigrating from Germany could use their assets to purchase German-manufactured goods for export, thus salvaging their personal assets during emigration.  The agreement provided a substantial export market for German factories in British-ruled Palestine. Between  November 1933, and 31 December 1937, 77,800,000 Reichmarks, or $22,500,000, (values in 1938 currency) worth of goods were exported to Jewish businesses in Palestine under the program. By the time the program ended with the start of World War II, the total had risen to 105,000,000 marks (about $35,000,000, 1939 values).

Emigrants with capital of £1,000, (about $5,000 in 1930s currency value) could move to Palestine in spite of severe British restrictions on Jewish immigration under an immigrant investor program similar to the modern EB-5 visa.  Under the Transfer Agreement, about 39% of an emigrant's funds were given to Jewish communal economic development projects, leaving individuals with about 43% of the funds.

The Haavara Agreement was thought by some German circles to be a possible way to solve the "Jewish problem." The head of the Middle Eastern division of the foreign ministry, the anti-Nazi politician Werner Otto von Hentig, supported the policy of settling Jews in Palestine. Hentig believed that if the Jewish population was concentrated in a single foreign entity, then foreign diplomatic policy and containment of the Jews would become easier. Hitler's own support of the Haavara Agreement was unclear and varied throughout the 1930s. Initially, Hitler seemed indifferent to the economic details of the plan, but he supported it in the period from September 1937 to 1939.

After the German invasion of Poland in September 1939 the program was ended.

Responses
The agreement was controversial both within the Nazi party and in the Zionist movement. As historian Edwin Black put it, "The Transfer Agreement tore the Jewish world apart, turning leader against leader, threatening rebellion and even assassination." Opposition came from the mainstream US leadership of the World Zionist Congress, in particular Abba Hillel Silver and American Jewish Congress president Rabbi Stephen Wise. Wise and other leaders of the Anti-Nazi boycott of 1933 argued against the agreement, narrowly failing to persuade the Nineteenth Zionist Congress in August 1935 to vote against it.

The right-wing Revisionist Zionists and their leader Vladimir Jabotinsky were even more vocal in their opposition. The Revisionist newspaper in Palestine, Hazit Haam published a sharp denunciation of those involved in the agreement as "betrayers", and shortly afterwards one of the negotiators, Haim Arlosoroff was assassinated.

See also
Leopold von Mildenstein
Évian Conference
Fifth Aliyah
Holocaust
Madagascar Plan
The Transfer Agreement

References

Further reading
 Avraham Barkai: German Interests in the Haavara-Transfer Agreement 1933–1939, Yearbook of the Leo Baeck Institute 35; 1990, S. 245–266
 Yehuda Bauer: Jews for sale?  Nazi-Jewish Negotiations, 1933-1945, Yale University Press, New Haven, CT, 1996. 
 Edwin Black: The Transfer Agreement: The Dramatic Story of the Pact Between the Third Reich and Jewish Palestine, Brookline Books, 1999.
 Werner Feilchenfeld, Dolf Michaelis, Ludwig Pinner: Haavara-Transfer nach Palästina und Einwanderung deutscher Juden 1933–1939, Tübingen, 1972
 Tom Segev: The Seventh Million: Israelis and the Holocaust (2000), especially p. 31ff
 David Yisraeli: "The Third Reich and the Transfer Agreement", in: Journal of Contemporary History 6 (1972), S. 129–148
 R. Melka: "Nazi Germany and the Palestine Question", Middle Eastern Studies. Vol. 5 No. 3 (Oct., 1969). pp 221–233.
 Hava Eshkoli-Wagman: "Yishuv Zionism: Its Attitude to Nazism and the Third Reich Reconsidered", Modern Judaism. Vol. 19 No. 1 (Feb., 1999). pp 21–40.
 Klaus Poleken: "The Secret Contacts: Zionism and Nazi Germany 1933–1941". Journal of Palestine Studies. Vol. 5 No. 3/4 (Spring–Summer 1976). pp 54–82.

External links

 Francis R. Nicosia The Third Reich & the Palestine question, Transaction Publishers, 2000.
 "Transfer Agreement" and the Boycott of German Goods

1933 documents
1933 in Judaism
Politics of Nazi Germany
Jewish Nazi German history
Jewish emigration from Nazi Germany
Jews and Judaism in Mandatory Palestine
Zionism